Eupithecia curacautinae is a moth in the family Geometridae. It is found in the regions of Biobio (Nuble Province) and Araucania (Malleco Province) in Chile. The habitat consists of the Northern Valdivian Forest Biotic Province.

The length of the forewings is about 7.8 mm for males and 8 mm for females. The forewings are brownish grey, with some reddish brown scales. The hindwings are slightly paler than the forewings and less irrorated with darker scales. Adults have been recorded on wing in December and February.

Etymology
The specific name is based on the type locality.

References

Moths described in 1987
curacautinae
Moths of South America
Endemic fauna of Chile